Nemotelus brevirostris is a species of soldier fly in the family Stratiomyidae.

Distribution
Austria, Bulgaria, Czech Republic, Germany, Greece, Hungary, Kazakhstan, Mongolia, Poland, Romania, Russia, Slovakia, Turkey, Yugoslavia.

References

Stratiomyidae
Insects described in 1822
Diptera of Asia
Diptera of Europe
Taxa named by Johann Wilhelm Meigen